A list of American films released in 1958. The musical romantic comedy film Gigi won Best Picture at the Academy Awards.

A-B

C-F

G-K

L-R

S-Z

See also
 1958 in the United States

References

External links

1958 films at the Internet Movie Database

1958
Films
Lists of 1958 films by country or language